Mahadev Prasad Mishra (1906 – 13 December 1995) was an Indian thumri singer from Benares (Varanasi).

Career
He was accompanied many times by Baccha Lal Mishra on sarangi and Ishwar Lal Mishra on tabla.

Death
Mishra died on 13 December 1995 at the age of 88.

References

1906 births
1995 deaths
People from Allahabad
People from Varanasi
Indian classical musicians
Recipients of the Sangeet Natak Akademi Award